Little Brak River may refer to:

 The Little Brak River (river), a river in the Western Cape province of South Africa
 Little Brak River (town), a town at the mouth of the river

See also 
 Great Brak River (disambiguation)
 Brak River